Khoshk is a village in South Khorasan Province, Iran.

Khoshk may also refer to:
 Khoshk-e Bijar, Gilan Province
 Khoshk, Rasht, Gilan Province
 Khoshk Rudbar, Mazandaran Province
 Khoshk-e Sara, Mazandaran Province